William Fremming Nielsen (born August 8, 1934) is a senior United States district judge of the United States District Court for the Eastern District of Washington.

Education and career

Born in Seattle, Washington, Nielsen received a Bachelor of Arts degree from the University of Washington in 1956 and was a United States Air Force First Lieutenant from 1956 to 1959. He received a Bachelor of Laws from the University of Washington School of Law in 1962. He was a law clerk to Judge Charles L. Powell of the  United States District Court for the Eastern District of Washington from 1963 to 1964. He was in private practice in Spokane, Washington from 1964 to 1991.

Federal judicial service

Nielsen was nominated by President George H. W. Bush on March 21, 1991, to a seat on the United States District Court for the Eastern District of Washington vacated by Judge Robert James McNichols. He was confirmed by the United States Senate on May 9, 1991, and received his commission on May 14, 1991. He served as Chief Judge from 1995 to 2000. He assumed senior status on May 30, 2003.

References

Sources

1934 births
Living people
Judges of the United States District Court for the Eastern District of Washington
United States district court judges appointed by George H. W. Bush
20th-century American judges
University of Washington School of Law alumni
University of Washington alumni
21st-century American judges